The Beriguruk were an indigenous Australian people, now thought to be extinct, of the Northern Territory.

Country
The Beriguruk used to inhabit the area southwards from the mouth of Mary River, mainly on its eastern bank, and running inland, but not frequenting the marshland and beaches of the coastal area, which were in the domain of the Djerimanga.

Alternative names
 Perrigurruk
 Eri, Erei
 Rereri, (?) Reveri (typo perhaps). 
 Wolna, Woolna, Woolner, Wulnar, Woolnough  Wulna.
 Wuna.
 Birrigarak (Warray exonym).
 Berrigurruk, Berugurruk.

Notes

Citations

Sources

Aboriginal peoples of the Northern Territory